Fu, often translated "rhapsody" or "poetic exposition", is a form of Chinese rhymed prose that was the dominant literary form in China during the Han dynasty (206AD220).  Fu are intermediary pieces between poetry and prose in which a place, object, feeling, or other subject is described and rhapsodized in exhaustive detail and from as many angles as possible. Fu distinguishing characteristics include alternating rhyme and prose, varying line length, close alliteration, onomatopoeia, loose parallelism, and extensive cataloging of their topics. Classical fu composers often tried to use as wide a vocabulary as possible, and their compositions are usually replete with rare and archaic Chinese words. They were not sung like songs, but were recited or chanted.

The fu genre came into being around the 3rd to 2nd centuries BC and continued to be regularly used into the Song dynasty (9601279). Fu were used as grand praises for the imperial courts, palaces, and cities, but were also used to write "fu on things", in which any place, object, or feeling was rhapsodized in exhaustive detail. The largest collections of historical fu are the Selections of Refined Literature (Wen xuan), the Book of Han, New Songs from the Jade Terrace, and official dynastic histories.

There is no counterpart or similar form to the fu genre in Western literature. During a large part of the 20th century, fu poetry was harshly criticized by Chinese scholars as excessively ornate, lacking in real emotion, and ambiguous in its moral messages.  Because of these historical associations, scholarship on fu poetry in China almost ceased entirely between 1949 and the end of the Cultural Revolution in 1976.  Since then, study of fu has gradually returned to its previous level.

History

Origins
The term "fu", when applied to Chinese literature, first appears in the Zhou dynasty ( 1046221), where it meant "to present", as in poetic recitations.  It was also one of the three literary devices traditionally assigned to the songs of the Classic of Poetry (Shijing).  Over the course of the late 1st millennium BC, fu became the name of poetic expositions in which an author or composer created a comprehensive exposition and performed it as a rhapsody.  Han dynasty historian Ban Gu in the "Monograph on Arts and Letters" defined fu as "to recite without singing" (bù gē ér sòng ).

Fu poetry is often viewed as a descendant of the Verses of Chu (Chu ci) songs combined with the rhetorical expositions of the Intrigues of the Warring States (Zhanguo ce).  During the golden age of fu in the 2nd century BC, many of the greatest fu composers were from the southwestern area of Shu (modern Sichuan Province). A chapter of Xunzi containing a series of riddles has been theorized to be the earliest known fu.  The earliest preserved and definitely datable fu is Jia Yi's "Fu on the Owl" (Fúniǎo fù ), composed about 170. Jia's surviving writings mention an earlier fu he wrote upon his exile to Changsha which he modeled upon Qu Yuan's "Encountering Sorrow" (Li Sao), but it has not survived to the present.

Han dynasty

Western Han
Fu achieved its greatest prominence during the early Han dynasty.  Jia Yi's "Fu on the Owl", written around 170 BC, was composed following on the third year of his exile to Changsha, and uses much of the style of the Li Sao and other songs of the Verses of Chu.  "Fu on the Owl", besides being the earliest known fu, is unusual in the author's extended use of philosophical reflection upon his own situation in life.

Emperor Wu of Han ascended the throne in 141 BC, and his 54-year reign is considered the golden age of "grand fu". Emperor Wu summoned famous fu writers to the imperial court in Chang'an, where many of them composed and presented fu to the entire court.  The earliest grand fu of Emperor Wu's reign is "Seven Stimuli" (Qī fā ), by Mei Sheng (d. 140 BC). In "Seven Stimuli", Mei Sheng acts as a Warring States-style travelling orator who tries to cure a Chu prince of an illness caused by overindulgence in sensual pleasures by pushing his senses to their limits with his fu descriptions.

Of all the authors from the golden age of "grand fu" composition, Sima Xiangru is generally considered to be the greatest.  A native of Chengdu, he was traditionally said to have been summoned to the imperial court after Emperor Wu happened to personally read his "Fu of Sir Vacuous" (Zǐxū fù ), though this is almost certainly a story added later.  After arriving in the capital around 136 BC, Sima Xiangru expanded his "Fu of Sir Vacuous" into his magnum opus, "Fu on the Imperial Park" (Shànglín fù ), generally considered the most famous  fu of all.  This work, whose original title was probably  "Fu on the Excursion Hunt of the Son of Heaven" (Tiānzǐ yóuliè fù ), is a grand celebration of the Emperor's personal hunting park east of Chang'an, and is famed for its rich number of rare and difficult words and characters.  If not for the survival of Chinese scholar Guo Pu's early 4th century AD annotations to "Fu on the Imperial Park", much of its ancient and esoteric terminology would now be unintelligible.  The following portion of the rhymed list of names of minerals, precious stones, and flora and fauna from the first half of the "Fu on the Imperial Park" exemplifies much of the cataloging and rare terminology characteristic of grand fu:

The grand fu of the Western Han dynasty were read and recited as celebrations of pure poetic delight, and were the first pieces of Chinese literature to fuse both unrestrained entertainment and moral admonitions together in single works.  However, after the reign of Emperor Wu, his court culture began to be criticized as having placed undue emphasis on the grandiose language in fu and therefore having missed opportunities to encourage moral restraint.  The most prominent critic of "grand fu" was the other great fu writer of the Han dynasty: Yang Xiong.  As a youth, Yang was an admirer and imitator of Sima Xiangru's fu, but later came to disapprove of grand fu.  Yang believed that the original purpose of fu was to "indirectly admonish" (fèng ), but that the extended rhetorical arguments and complex vocabulary used in grand fu caused their hearers and readers to marvel at their aesthetic beauty while missing their moral messages.  Yang juxtaposed early Han dynasty fu with the fu-like expositions in the Classic of Poetry, saying that while those in the Poetry provided moral standards, the fu of the Han poets "led to excess".  While known as one of the fu masters of the Han dynasty, Yang's fu are generally known for their focus on admonishing readers and listeners to uphold moral values.

Eastern Han
Two of the most famous fu writers of the Eastern Han period were the polymaths Zhang Heng and Cai Yong. Among Zhang Heng's large corpus of writings are a significant number of fu poems, which are the first to have been written in the shorter style that became typical of post-Han fu.  Zhang's earliest known fu is "Fu on the Hot Springs" (Wēnquán fù ), which describes the hot springs at Mount Li (modern Huaqing Pool) which famously later became a favorite of Imperial Concubine Yang during the Tang dynasty.  "Fu on the Two Metropolises" (Èr jīng fù ) is considered Zhang's masterpiece.  Zhang spent ten years gathering material for the fu, a response to an earlier fu by Ban Gu that is a poetic comparison between the two capitals of the Han dynasty: Luoyang and Chang'an.  Zhang's fu is highly satirical and cleverly mocks many aspects of the Western Han period, including Emperor Wu himself The piece contains long passages colorfully describing life in the two capitals in great detail, including the entertainment areas.

Cai Yong, like Zhang Heng, was a prolific writer in addition to his mathematical, astronomical, and musical interests.  In 159 CE, Cai was summoned to Chang'an to perform on the guqin for the imperial court, but became ill shortly before arriving and returned to his home.  Cai composed a poetic record of his journey in "Fu on Recounting a Journey" (Shù xíng fù ), his most well-known fu.  In "Fu on Recounting a Journey", Cai cites examples of treacherous and dishonest rulers and officials from Chinese history, then criticizes the eunuchs of the capital for similar crimes.

A number of fu writers from the late 2nd and early 3rd centuries CE became considered great fu poets, and were noted for their descriptions of the chaos and destruction following the collapse of the Han dynasty.  Wang Can, who lived as a refugee in Chu following the assassination of Dong Zhuo in 192 CE, wrote a famous fu entitled "Fu on Climbing the Tower" (Dènglóu fù ) in which Wang movingly describes climbing a tower near Jingzhou and gazing longingly in the direction of his home in Luoyang.  Poets often used subjects of descriptive fu poems to symbolize themselves, as in "Fu on the Parrot" (Yīngwǔ fù ), by Mi Heng, in which Mi uses a caged parrot as an allegory for a scholar whose talents go unrecognized and whose inability to control his tongue results in his captivity.  During the Three Kingdoms period, the court of the warlord Cao Cao and his sons Cao Pi and Cao Zhi became a famous literary salon, and a number of fu poems from their court have survived to modern times.

Six Dynasties

During the Six Dynasties period (220589), fu remained a major part of contemporary poetry, although shi poetry was gradually increasing in popularity.  Six Dynasties fu are generally much shorter and less extravagant than Han dynasty fu, likely due to a tradition of composing works entirely in parallel couplets that arose during the period. While lyrical fu and "fu on things" had been starkly different forms in the Han dynasty, after the 2nd century CE the distinction mostly disappeared.  Although the extravagant fu style of the Han mostly disappeared, "fu on things" continued to be widely written.

Xie Lingyun is one of the best-known poets of the entire Six Dynasties period, second only to Tao Yuanming. In contrast to his older contemporary Tao, Xie is known for the difficult language, dense allusions, and frequent parallelisms of his poetry.  Xie's greatest fu is "Fu on Dwelling in the Mountains" (Shān jū fù ), a Han-style "grand fu" describing Xie's personal estate that borrows its style from the famous "Fu on the Imperial Park" by Sima Xiangru.  Like classical Han fu, the poem uses a large number of obscure and rare characters, but "Fu on Dwelling in the Mountains" is unique in that Xie included his own annotations to the poem, without which the poem would be nearly incomprehensible.

During the Liang dynasty (502587), fu continued to be a popular form of literature, though it began to merge with the popular five- and seven-syllable poetry forms, which completely eclipsed fu during the Tang dynasty. Some fu pieces, such as Shen Yue's "Fu on Dwelling in the Suburbs" (Jiāo jū fù )an homage to Xie Lingyun's "Fu on Dwelling in the Mountains"followed the traditional forms and subjects of classical fu, but an increasing number did not. "Fu on Lotus-picking" (Cǎi lián fù ), by Xiao Gang (later Emperor Jianwen of Liang), is a short, lyrical fu that mixes freely with popular lyric poetry, and portrayed southern China as a romantic land of pleasure and sensuality. Lotus-picking was an activity traditionally associated with peasant women, but in the early 5th century became a popular topic in fu and poetry.

Yu Xin is generally considered the last great fu poet of Chinese history.  Yu, like Yan Zhitui, was born in the south but forced to relocate to northern China after the south's defeat, and spent the rest of his career writing of the loss of the south as a loss of an entire culture and way of life. Yu's most famous piece is "Fu on Lamenting the South" (Āi Jiāngnán fù ), in which he describes his life's experiences in the context of the larger context of the destruction of the south and its culture.

Tang and Song dynasties
The fu genre changed rapidly during the Tang dynasty (618907). During the early Tang, a new form of fu called "regulated fu" (lǜfù ) supplanted the original form.  "Regulated fu" had strict rules of form and expression, and required the use of consistent rhymes throughout each piece. Additionally, rules were created to govern the arrangement of tones in each poem, as the introduction of Buddhist texts written in Sanskrit and Pali had stimulated the Chinese to methodical study of their own language and the identification of the four tones of Middle Chinese. Beginning in the Tang dynasty, these "regulated fu" were required for the composition sections of the imperial examinations.  Tang writers added new topics to the traditional subjects of fu, such as purely moral topics or scenes from Chinese antiquity.  The "parallel fu" (piānfù ) was another variant of the fu developed in the Tang, and was only used for rhetorical compositions.

In 826, Tang poet Du Mu's poem "Fu on E-pang Palace" (Ēpáng gōng fù ) laid the foundation for a new form of fu called "prose fu" (wénfù ), in which prose is freely rhymed.  This form of fu became the dominant fu form during the late Tang and the Song dynasty (9601279). By the 9th and 10th centuries, traditional fu had become mainly historical pursuits, and were largely read and copied because of their inclusion on the imperial examinations.

Topics

"Fu on things"
Between 130 and 100 BC, Emperor Wu greatly expanded China's territory into Central Asia, northern Vietnam, and the Korean Peninsula through a series of military campaigns and invasions.  As the expansion progressed, a large number of foreign plants, animals, goods, and rarities were brought to the imperial capital at Chang'an.  Throughout the Han dynasty, court officials and poets often composed special fu called "fu on things" (yǒngwù fù ) on these new and unusual things, in which they described and catalogued extensively.  These "fu on things" became a major genre in fu poetry, and cover a vast number of instruments, objects, and phenomena.

Ban Zhao, one of the most famous female poets of Chinese history, wrote a well-known fu during the reign of Emperor He of Han entitled "Fu on the Great Bird" (Dà què fù ), believed to be a description of an ostrich brought to the Han court from Parthia around 110 CE.  Scholar Ma Rong wrote two well-known fu on ancient board games: his "Fu on Chaupar" (Chūpú fù ), which the Chinese believed to actually have been invented by Laozi after he departed west out of China, and his "Fu on Encirclement Chess" (Wěiqí fù ),  one of the earliest known descriptions of the game Go.  Han dynasty librarian Wang Yi, best known as the compiler of the received version of the Verses of Chu, wrote several object-description fu in the early 2nd century CE, such as "Fu on the Lychee" (Lìzhī fù ), the earliest known poetic description of the lychee fruit.

The literary salon of Cao Pi's court produced a number of notable "fu on things" in which a group of poets known as the Seven Masters of the Jian'an period each composed their own version of the fu. During this period, Cao Pi was once presented with a large agate of unusual quality which Cao had made into a bridle. Each of the men composed their own "Fu on the Agate Bridle" (Mǎnǎo lè fù ) for the occasion.  Another object-description fu from the Cao court is "Fu on the Musāragalva Bowl" (Chēqú wǎn fù ), which was a bowl made of a coral- or shell-like substance from somewhere near India, which was then known as the "Western Regions".

One of the poet Shu Xi's (263–302 CE) fu has become well known in the history of Chinese cuisine: his "Fu on Pasta" (Bǐng fù ) is an encyclopedic description of a wide variety of dough-based foods, including noodles, steamed buns, and dumplings, which had not yet become the traditional Chinese foods they are in modern times. Western Jin poet Fu Xian's "Fu on Paper" (Zhǐ fù ) is well known as an early description of writing paper, which had only been invented about 150 years earlier.

Sociopolitical protest
Part of the legacy associated with the fu is its use as a form of sociopolitical protest, such as the theme of the loyal minister who has been unjustly exiled by the ruler or those in power at the court, rather than receiving the promotion and respect which he truly deserves. In the Verses of Chu, one of the works attributed to Qu Yuan is the "Li Sao", which is one of the earliest known works in this tradition, both as ancestral to the fu as well as its incorporation of political criticism as a theme of poetry.  The theme of unjust exile is related to the development of Xiaoxiang poetry, or the  poetry stylistically or thematically based upon lamenting the unjust exile of the poet, either directly, or allegorically through the use of the persona of a friend or historical figure (a safer course in the case of a poet-official who might be punished for any too blatant criticism of the current emperor). During the Han Dynasty, along with the development of the fu stylistically, the idea that it incorporate political criticism through indirection and allegory also developed. Han Dynasty historian and author Ban Gu in his Book of Han pointedly refers to a fu by Qu Yuan as a literary example of the use of the theme of the loyal minister who has been unjustly exiled, rather than receiving the promotion and respect which he truly deserves. As Hellmut Wilhelm puts it: "...the Han fu can easily be classified into a limited number of types. All types have one feature in common: almost without exception they can be and have been interpreted as voicing criticism—either of the ruler, the ruler's behavior, or certain political acts or plans of the ruler; or of the court officials or the ruler's favorites; or, generally, of the lack of discrimination in the employment of officials. The few examples that are positive in tone recommend the authors or their peers for employment, or even contain specific political suggestions. In short, almost all fu have a political purport, and, in addition, almost all of them deal with the relationship between the ruler and his officials." Seen in context, Ban Gu's discussion of Qu Yuan and the Chu sao style is less to the point of the actual evolutionary path of the fu and more to the point that the main purpose of the fu is political and social criticism through poetic indirection: thus, in fu, paradoxically, the "fantastic descriptions and an overflowing rhetoric...can be reduced to...restraint", as the sociopolitical criticism which was key to the fu was constrained within a very subtle, elaborately indirect, occasional, and allusive mode.

Collections
Fu pieces comprise the first main category in the Wen Xuan (Selections of Refined Literature), an early Chinese literary anthology which is still extant.  The Selections collects all known fu pieces from the early Han dynasty to its compilation in the 6th century CE, during the Liang dynasty; it has since been the traditional source for studying classical fu.

In the late 17th and early 18th centuries, during the reign of the Kangxi Emperor, scholar Chen Yuanlong (16521736) compiled a collection of all known fu extant in his day, publishing his collection in 1706 as Collection of Fu Through the Ages (Lìdài fù huì ). Chen's Collection in total contains 4,155 fu.

See also
Classical Chinese poetry forms
Dong Zhongshu
Han poetry

Notes

References

Footnotes

Works cited

 
 
 
 
 
 
 
 
 
 
 

Chinese poetry forms
Han dynasty poetry